is a 2011 Japanese live-action film based on Tobaku Hakairoku Kaiji, the second part of the manga series Kaiji, written and illustrated by Nobuyuki Fukumoto. It is the second film of a trilogy directed by Tōya Satō and premiered in Japan on November 5, 2011. It was followed by Kaiji: Final Game released in 2020.

Cast
Tatsuya Fujiwara as Kaiji Itō
Yūsuke Iseya as Seiya Ichijō
Yuriko Yoshitaka as Hiromi Ishida
Katsuhisa Namase as Kōtarō Sakazaki
Teruyuki Kagawa as Yukio Tonegawa
Suzuki Matsuo as Taro Ōtsuki
Hayato Kakizawa as Murakami
Ken Mitsuishi as Kōji Ishida
Tarō Yamamoto as Jōji Funai
Kyūsaku Shimada as Yoshihiro Kurosaki
Maxwell Powers as Swamp (voice)

Soundtrack
Yugo Kanno composed the music for the film. The original score was released on November 2, 2011.

Release
Kaiji 2 was announced in November 2009. Kaiji 2 was theatrically released on November 5, 2011, in Japan. It was released on Blu-ray and DVD on April 25, 2012.

The film was screened at the anime convention AM² in Anaheim, California in June 2012.

Reception

Box office
Kaiji 2 was Japan's nineteenth highest-grossing film of 2011, earning  at the Japanese box office that year. The film also grossed $68,175 overseas in Singapore, bringing the film's international total gross to $21,068,175.

Critical reception
In a review of  Kaiji 2, Maggie Lee of The Hollywood Reporter felt little suspense and satisfaction with the characters and the actors' performance. She wrote that the cast "cranks up their acting" but due their "cardboard" roles they "have no hopes of being more than that". Lee expressed no excitement in the "character reversals", pointing out that they have become quite common in the survival game genre, with works like Liar Game or The Incite Mill, stating "no matter how many times the key persons in Kaiji switch their allegiances, it no longer surprises." Nevertheless, Lee praised the camera movements, music and sound levels, ultimately calling the film a "geeky but still entertaining sequel to the crowd-pleasing "gambling" genre."

References

External links
 Official website 
 Nippon TV English official website
 
 

Films about death games
Films set in Japan
Films about gambling
2010s Japanese-language films
Kaiji (manga)
Live-action films based on manga
Toho films
Films directed by Tōya Satō